Iolcus (also rendered Iolkos ;  and  Ἰαωλκός;) is an ancient city, a modern village and a former municipality in Magnesia, Thessaly, Greece. Since the 2011 local government reform it is part of the municipality Volos, of which it is a municipal unit. It is located in central Magnesia, north of the Pagasitic Gulf. Its land area is 1.981 km². The municipal unit is divided into three communities, Agios Onoufrios (pop. 475), Anakasia (pop. 1012) and Ano Volos (pop. 651), with a total population of 2,138 (2011 census). The seat of the former municipality was the village of Ano Volos.

Mythology

According to ancient Greek mythology, Aeson was the rightful king of Iolcus, but his half-brother Pelias usurped the throne. It was Pelias who sent Aeson's son Jason and his Argonauts to look for the Golden Fleece. The ship Argo set sail from Iolcus with a crew of fifty demigods and princes under Jason's leadership. Their mission was to reach Colchis in Aea at the eastern seaboard of the Black Sea, and to reclaim and bring back the Golden Fleece.

Along with the Golden Fleece, Jason brought a wife, the sorceress Medea—king Aeetes' daughter, granddaughter of Helios, niece of Circe, princess of Aea, and later queen of Iolcus, Corinth and Aea, and also murderer of her brother Absyrtus, and her two sons from Jason. She is a tragic figure whose trials and tribulations were artfully dramatized in the much-staged play by Euripides, Medea.

Iolcus is mentioned by Homer, in the Catalogue of Ships in the Iliad, and later in the Odyssey; he gives it the epithets of ἐϋκτιμένη ("well built") and εὐρύχορος ("with broad places", "spacious"). The Bibliotheca of Pseudo-Apollodorus says the city was founded by Cretheus, and to have been colonised by Minyans from Orchomenos.

History
Anciently, Iolcus was situated in Magnesia, ancient Thessaly, and was a polis (city-state). It is rarely mentioned in historical times. It was given by the Thessalians to Hippias, upon his expulsion from Athens in 511/510 BCE, but he rejected it. It is also quoted in the Periplus of Pseudo-Scylax as a city belonging to Magnesia. The town afterwards suffered from the dissensions of its inhabitants, but it was finally ruined by Demetrius Poliorcetes' foundation of Demetrias in 294 BCE, when the inhabitants of Iolcus and of other adjoining towns were removed to that place. It seems to have been no longer in existence in the time of Strabo, since he speaks of the place where Iolcus stood. Strabo states that a festal assembly was held there in honor of Pelias.

Site
The position of Iolcus is indicated by Strabo, who says that it was on the road from Boebe to Demetrias, and at the distance of 7 stadia from the latter. In another passage he says that Iolcus is situated above the sea at the distance of 7 stadia from Demetrias. Pindar places Iolcus is at the foot of Mount Pelion, consequently a little inland. It might indeed appear, from Livy, that Iolcus was situated upon the coast; but in this passage, as well as in Strabo, the name of Iolcus seems to have been given to this part of the coast as well as to the city itself.

Historical population

See also 
 List of ancient Greek cities

References

 
Populated places disestablished in the 3rd century BC
Mycenaean sites in Thessaly
Cities in ancient Greece
Populated places in Magnesia (regional unit)
Ancient Magnesia
Former populated places in Greece
Volos
Locations in Greek mythology
Populated places in ancient Thessaly
Locations in the Iliad
Thessalian city-states